Ente Ammu Ninte Thulasi Avarude Chakki is 1985 family melodrama  film in Malayalam, starring Balachandra Menon, Venu Nagavalli and Urvashi. The film was directed and written by Balachandra Menon.

Plot
S. Nandakumar (Balachandra Menon ), a dentist, sets a trap for his friend Shakthi who once loved "Ammu" and left her. Nandakumar invites him to his house for a vacation with him and introduces his wife "Thulasi" to him, who is his ex-lover. Nandakumar acts as not having knowledge about this and keeps telling him about his wife. And finally he tells him that she is not his wife and this was a trap to join them.

Cast
Balachandra Menon as Dr. S. Nandakumar Menon
Venu Nagavalli as Shakthi/Ouseppu/Joseph
Urvashi as Ammu (as called by Nandakumar, her husband) / Thulasi (as called by Shakthi, her ex-lover) / Chakki (as called by her parents)
Bharath Gopi as Thega Chellappan Pillai	
Kaviyoor Ponnamma as Sathyabhama
Sankaradi as Vasu Pillai	
Seema as Elsi
Thodupuzha Vasanthi
T. P. Madhavan
 Baiju as Cameo Appearance
Kollam Ajith as Cameo Appearance

Soundtrack 
The music was composed by Kannur Rajan and the lyrics were written by O. N. V. Kurup.

References

External links
 
 Ente Ammu Ninte Thulasi Avarude Chakki at Vinodakeralam.com

1985 films
1980s Malayalam-language films
Films directed by Balachandra Menon